The National Wildflower Centre opened in the Knowsley borough of Merseyside in 2000 as a Millennium project, funded by the Millennium Commission and Big Lottery. It closed in January 2017 and the Eden Project stepped in to save its legacy and build a new partnership that will continue to flourish from its new South West base. Originally located in Court Hey Park, Liverpool, the visitor attraction was hoped to regenerate and help communities in the local area.  The centre was designed around the concept of Wildflowers. This was combined with a visitor centre, a shop and a cafe.

The National Wildflower Centre is now based at the Eden Project, Cornwall. It continues its work nationally, particularly focusing on urban ecological regeneration in cities such as Liverpool and Manchester, and the establishment of local provenance seed for projects in the South West. Several meadows have been established on the Eden Project site and are accessible to the public free of charge.

The original attraction remained in operation until the early months of 2017, when owner and operator Landlife went into liquidation and, subsequently, the National Wildflower Centre was closed in order to raise funds. Landlife blamed decreasing visitor numbers, expensive maintenance of the buildings and grounds, and a new threat, severe vandalism. Landlife also blamed the contractor that  constructed the buildings, Kier Group. Landlife claimed that in just 16 years, the buildings had visibly badly weathered and the roof of the visitor centre and cafe would regularly leak-in water. Since the attractions closure, the site's entrances have been sealed and windows boarded up. In 2019 Knowsley Metropolitan Borough Council announced that they were looking for a buyer for the site. If successful, the site would be refurbished.

References 	

Museums in the United Kingdom